Bettler GmbH is a 1919 German silent film directed by Alwin Neuß and starring Paul Otto and Lil Dagover.

Cast
 Fritz Achterberg
 Lil Dagover
 Fred Goebel
 Alwin Neuß as Bobby
 Paul Otto

References

Bibliography

External links

1919 films
Films of the Weimar Republic
German silent feature films
Films directed by Alwin Neuß
German black-and-white films
1910s German films